Lieutenant-General William Kerr, 2nd Marquess of Lothian,  (1661 – 28 February 1722) was a Scottish peer who held a number of minor military and political offices. He was known by the courtesy title of Lord Newbattle until 1692, when he succeeded as Lord Jedburgh, then as Marquess of Lothian when his father died in 1703.

Life

William Kerr was born in 1661, eldest son of Robert Kerr, 1st Marquess of Lothian (1636–1703) and his wife, Jean Campbell (d. 1700), daughter of Archibald Campbell, 1st Marquess of Argyll. Through their relationship with Argyll, the family was closely associated with Presbyterian and Whig interests and supported the 1688 Glorious Revolution.

Little is known of his early life but in June 1685, he married his cousin Lady Jean Campbell (1661–1712), third daughter of 9th Earl of Argyll, who was executed after the failed Argyll's Rising in June 1685. They had a son, William, 3rd Marquess of Lothian (1690–1767) and four daughters, Anne (died 1727), Jean (died March 1768), Elizabeth (died May 1758) and Mary (died 1768).

Career
Under the title 'Lord Newbattle,' Kerr served as a Commissioner of Supply in 1685 and 1686 but his family's links to Argyll meant they were out of favour during the reign of James II & VII. Under William and Mary, he was Captain of an Independent Troop of Horse, ten of which were raised in April 1689 as a short-term response to the 1689-1691 Jacobite Rising. In 1691, these were re-organised as two regiments, Cunningham's Regiment, later 7th Dragoons and Lord Jedburgh's Dragoons, after Kerr inherited the title of Lord Jedburgh in 1692. He sat under this name in the Parliament of Scotland until its dissolution in 1707. 

Until 1694, when Richard Cunningham's regiment transferred to Flanders, these units were used for internal security and funded by the Scottish Parliament. After Cunningham was promoted Brigadier General, Jedburgh became Colonel of the 7th Dragoons in October 1696, but by now the Nine Years War was effectively over. Since regiments were named after their Colonel, for a few months there were two known as 'Lord Jedburgh's Dragoons;' the Scottish one was disbanded in October 1697, after the Treaty of Ryswick.

Until the 1868 Cardwell Reforms, commissions were private assets that could be bought or sold and did not require actual service. Though less common as soldiering became more professional, some Colonels remained civilians who delegated their duties to a subordinate. Jedburgh seems to have been one of these, as he has no record of active service, unlike his brothers Lord Mark Kerr and Lord John Kerr, who both commanded regiments of their own.

Despite this, he was promoted Brigadier when the War of the Spanish Succession began in 1702, while his father was created Marquess of Lothian and nominated a Commissioner for the proposed Union with England. He succeeded his father as Marquess after his death in 1703, was appointed Major General in 1704 and closely associated with his nephew, the 2nd Duke of Argyll in negotiations for the Acts of Union. In return, he was created a Knight of the Thistle in 1705 but lost influence when Argyll was replaced by the Duke of Queensberry as Lord High Commissioner.

In a summary of Scottish politicians prepared in 1704, the government agent John Macky described him as follows; "He hath abundance of fire, and may prove himself a man of business when he applies himself that way; laughs at all revealed religion, yet sets up for a pillar of Presbytery, and proves the surest card in their pack, being very zealous though not devout; he is brave in his person, loves his country and his bottle, a thorough libertine, very handsome, black, with a fine eye, forty-five years old."

When George Ramsay, Commander-in-Chief, Scotland and Colonel of the Scots Regiment of Foot Guards died in September 1705, Lothian wanted to replace him in both positions. However, the Earl of Leven became C-in-C instead while he was not appointed Colonel until April 1707.

He supported the Union and due to his connections with Argyll, was appointed Lieutenant General in 1708 and elected as one of the 16 Scottish Representative Peers for 1707 and 1708. However, he was removed from the House of Lords in 1709 after the vote was challenged, while the Tory landslide victory in the 1710 General Election meant the loss of his positions, including his Colonelcy in 1713. Although restored to the Lords after the accession of George I in 1715, he played little active part in politics; he died in 1722 and was buried in Westminster Abbey.

References

Knights of the Thistle
British Army lieutenant generals
Burials at Westminster Abbey
Scottish representative peers
1661 births
1722 deaths
7th Queen's Own Hussars officers
Scots Guards officers
Marquesses of Lothian